Aryn Martin is a sociologist, and historian of biomedicine, as well as a scholar of feminist science and technology studies at York University, where she is an associate professor of sociology. She is affiliated with the graduate programs in social, political, science, technology, and environmental studies. She received her Bachelor of Science in biology at Queen's University, a master's degree in environmental studies at York University, and a PhD in science and technology studies at Cornell University, under the supervision of Michael Lynch. Her work is on feminist theories of the body and biology, especially the implications for identity surrounding the phenomenon of fetomaternal microchimerism and other forms of genetic chimeras. Her dissertation on the history of human chimeras was funded by the National Science Foundation

In 2017, Martin became the Associate Dean of Students at York University's Faculty of Graduate Studies.

References

External links 

Academic staff of York University
York University alumni
Queen's University at Kingston alumni
Cornell University alumni
Sociologists of science
Historians of science
Medical sociologists
Canadian sociologists
Science and technology studies scholars
Year of birth missing (living people)
Living people
Canadian women sociologists